Tonneins is a railway station in Tonneins, Nouvelle-Aquitaine, France. The station is located on the Bordeaux–Sète railway. The station is served by TER (local) services operated by SNCF.

Train services
The following services currently call at Tonneins:
local service (TER Nouvelle-Aquitaine) Bordeaux - Langon - Marmande - Agen

References

Railway stations in Lot-et-Garonne